Kostin is a Russian masculine surname, its feminine counterpart is Kostina. The surname is derived from Kostya, a pet form of the male given name Konstantin, and literally means Kostya's. It may refer to:

 Aleksandr Kostin (born 1969), Russian football player
 Aleksandra Kulicheva (Kostina, born 1987), Russian basketball player
 Andrey Kostin (born 1956), Russian banker
 Andriy Kostin (born 1973), Ukrainian lawyer and politician
 Denis Kostin (born 1995), Russian ice hockey goaltender
 Ekaterina Kostina, Belarusian-German mathematician
 Igor Kostin (1936–2015), Soviet photographer
 Kirill Kostin (born 1994), Russian football player
 Klim Kostin (born 1999), Russian professional ice hockey winger
 Konstantin Kostin (born 1973), Latvian figure skater
 Konstantin Kostin (politician) (born 1970), Russian politician
 Maria Kostina (born 1983), Russian golfer
 Mikhail Kostin (born 1985), Russian football player
 Oleg Kostin (born 1992), Russian swimmer
 Oxana Kostina (1972–1993), Russian rhythmic gymnast
 Sergei Kostin (born 1991), Russian football defender
 Vera Kostina (born 1932), Soviet former swimmer
 Vladimir Kostin (1921–1994), Russian basketball referee

Russian-language surnames